Dialectical Anthropology is a Marxist peer-reviewed academic journal of  anthropology published by Springer Science+Business Media. It was established in 1975 by Stanley Diamond (New School for Social Research). In its first decade the journal oriented towards post-Vietnam radicalism.

Following Diamond's death in 1991, Donald Nonini took the role of acting editor-in-chief for two years. In 1993 Diamond's widow, Marie Josephine Diamond became editor-in-chief. In 2001 she was succeeded by Sabine Jell-Bahlsen and Wolf-Dieter Narr. In 2008, Anthony Marcus and Kirk Dombrowski (City University of New York) became editors-in-chief. In 2010 the journal added a third editor-in-chief, Ananthakrishnan Aiyer (University of Michigan–Flint), who remained until he died in 2015. In 2013, Dombrowski was succeeded by Winnie Lem (Trent University).

Abstracting and indexing 
The journal is abstracted and indexed by Scopus, FRANCIS, International Bibliography of the Social Sciences, MLA International Bibliography, and PASCAL.

References

External links 
 

Anthropology journals
English-language journals
Marxist journals
Publications established in 1975
Quarterly journals
Springer Science+Business Media academic journals